Hongseong (Hongseong-gun) is a county in South Korea, and the capital of South Chungcheong Province. The current governor is Yeoung Lock Lee. The original name of the city is Hongju.

Symbols
 The flag represents the Joyang Gate along with the west coastal line.
 The region's flower is the forsythia, which symbolizes the warmth and kindness in the hearts of the people of Hongseong.
 The region's tree is the zelkova, which is known for providing a lot of shade. This symbolizes the loyalty and patriotism of the people of Hongseong.
 The region's bird is the magpie, which is also the national bird of Korea. It symbolizes good luck, good news and hope.

Population

Climate

Historical figures
Historical figures born in Hongseong:
 Choe Yeong (1316): General during the Goryeo Dynasty
 Seong Sammun (1418): Notable scholar during the Joseon Dynasty
 Han Seong-jun (1875): Master of Korean dance during the Japanese Colonial Era
 Han Yong-un (1879): Buddhist reformer
 Kim Jwa-jin (1889): anarcho-communist activist

Cultural assets
In Hongseong, a large statue of Buddha is engraved on a protruding rock carved into the shape of a shrine. Overall, the headpiece is solid and integrity is shown on the face, but the statue is unbalanced from its loss of volume towards the bottom.

Site attributed to Choe Yeong:
 Gibongsa: in Noeunli, shrine that was reconstructed in 1995; site of a memorial service every fall to comfort General Yeong's soul

Sites attributed to Seong Sammun:
 Teacher Seong Sammum’s Tomb: in Noeunli, where his mother's family lived and where he was born; previously a lecture hall closed in 1676
Teacher Seong Sammum Memorial Stone: in Noeunli, preservation house for engraved Yuheobi memorial stone
 Noeundan: in Noeunri, site of memorial service performed every October 10; holds Seong Sammun's ancestral tablets

Sites attributed to Han Yong-un:
 Birthplace of Manhae, Han Yongwun: a memorial in Gyeolseongmyeon
 Manhaesa Shrine: in Hongbukmyeon, built to hold his portrait
 Statue of Manhae, Han Yongwun: in Namjangli, built to set his work as an indication of national spirit
 Manhae, Han Yongwun Culture Experience Hall: in Gyeolseongmyeon, built in 2007 in front of his birthplace to commemorate his spirit and philosophy

Sites attributed to Kim Jwajin:
 Birthplace of General Kim Jwajin: in Paekya Park in Galsanmyeon, where he was born and raised; restoration started in 1991
 Memorial stone to pay a tribute to the memory of General Kim Jwajin: in Galsanmyeon, describes his achievements; constructed in 1949
 Statue of General Kim Jwajin: in Goamli, articulates his achievement when he wiped out a Japanese army at 31 years of age
 Baekyasa: in Galsanmyeon, shrine where service is held during the Baekya festival every October 25

Festivals
 Namdangli Cockle Festival: The coastal topographical features of the Hongseong area, particularly the Cheonsu Bay area, provide abundant egg cockles. Egg cockles taste unique and not easy to eat in city areas. Because of these reasons, the festival gradually became successful. However, an oil spill around Taean made it difficult to host this festival recently. Hongseong did not suffer direct damage from the oil spill. The county took place as the host on Jan 16 of 2008.
 Naepo Festival: First begun in 2004, this festival honors the Naepo culture throughout Hongseong in the month of October. It represents the loyalty of the culture of Hongseong people. It includes many competitions and performances while commemorating General Choe Yeong and those who sacrificed their lives in the battle at Hongju Castle.
 Festival of General Kim’s victory: This festival is held every October at General Kim Jwa-jin's birthplace and shrine to commemorate his victory in Cheongsanli. The spectacles include Bongsan Mask dancing, pungmul performance, military school events, makgeolli tasting, and more.

See also
 Geography of South Korea

References

External links
Official local government website

 
Counties of South Chungcheong Province